McAnulty is a surname. It is a variant of McNulty. 

Notable people with the name include: 
Dara McAnulty (born 2004), Northern Irish naturalist and writer
George McAnulty (played in 1952), New Zealand Association football player
Henry J. McAnulty (1915–1995), Roman Catholic priest and American academic 
James P. McAnulty (in office 2013-2015), American diplomat
John McAnulty (died 1989), Northern Irish Catholic who was murdered
Kieran McAnulty (born 1985), New Zealand politician
Nicholas McAnulty, actor in Australian/British 2009 film The Boys Are Back 
Paul McAnulty (born 1981), American baseball outfielder
Sarah McAnulty (active 2011-), American squid biologist and science communicator
William E. McAnulty Jr. (1947–2007), justice of the Kentucky Supreme Court

See also
McNulty
McAnulty College and Graduate School of Liberal Arts, part of Duquesne University, Pennsylvania, United States

References